The Russia women's national artistic gymnastics team represents Russia in FIG international competitions. Additionally, they have competed as the Russian Olympic Committee (ROC) and the Russian Gymnastics Federation (RGF) due to the World Anti-Doping Agency banning athletes from representing Russia in international competition. While competing under the Russian Olympic Committee, they won the gold medal at the 2020 Olympic Games. They also won the team gold medal at the 2010 World Championships and at the inaugural Junior World Championships in 2019.

After the 2022 Russian invasion of Ukraine, the International Gymnastics Federation (FIG) barred Russian athletes and officials, including judges. It also announced that "all FIG World Cup and World Challenge Cup events planned to take place in Russia ... are cancelled, and no other FIG events will be allocated to Russia ... until further notice." FIG also banned the Russian flag at its events. European Gymnastics announced in March 2022 that no athletes, officials, and judges from the Russian Gymnastics Federation can participate in any European Gymnastics events, that no European Gymnastics authorities from Russias can pursue their functions, and that European Gymnastics had removed from its calendar all events allocated to Russia and would not allocate any future events to Russia.

History
At the Olympic Games, Russia has made seven appearances in the women's team competition and won six medals, including a gold in 2020. Russia has also won ten medals in the World Artistic Gymnastics Championships women's team competition.

After the 2022 Russian invasion of Ukraine, the International Gymnastics Federation (FIG) barred Russian athletes and officials, including judges. It also announced that "all FIG World Cup and World Challenge Cup events planned to take place in Russia ... are cancelled, and no other FIG events will be allocated to Russia ... until further notice." FIG also banned the Russian flag at its events.

Current senior roster

Team competition results
Names in italics denote alternates who received a medal.

Olympic Games
 1928 through 1992 — participated as the Soviet Union
 1996 —  silver medal
Elena Dolgopolova, Rozalia Galiyeva, Elena Grosheva, Svetlana Khorkina, Dina Kochetkova, Yevgeniya Kuznetsova, Oksana Lyapina
 2000 —  silver medal
Anna Chepeleva, Svetlana Khorkina, Anastasiya Kolesnikova, Yekaterina Lobaznyuk, Yelena Produnova, Elena Zamolodchikova
 2004 —  bronze medal
Ludmila Ezhova, Svetlana Khorkina, Maria Kryuchkova, Anna Pavlova, Elena Zamolodchikova, Natalia Ziganshina
 2008 — 4th place
Ksenia Afanasyeva, Svetlana Klyukina, Ekaterina Kramarenko, Anna Pavlova, Ludmila Grebenkova, Ksenia Semyonova
 2012 —  silver medal
Ksenia Afanasyeva, Anastasia Grishina, Viktoria Komova, Aliya Mustafina, Maria Paseka
 2016 —  silver medal
Angelina Melnikova, Aliya Mustafina, Maria Paseka, Daria Spiridonova, Seda Tutkhalyan
 2020 —  gold medal – participated as the Russian Olympic Committee
Lilia Akhaimova, Viktoria Listunova, Angelina Melnikova, Vladislava Urazova

World Championships

 1934 through 1991 — participated as the Soviet Union
 1994 —  bronze medal
Oxana Fabrichnova, Elena Grosheva, Natalia Ivanova, Svetlana Khorkina, Dina Kochetkova, Elena Lebedeva, Evgenia Roschina
 1995 — 4th place
Natalia Bobrova, Elena Dolgopolova, Elena Grosheva, Svetlana Khorkina, Dina Kochetkova, Yevgeniya Kuznetsova, Yelena Produnova
 1997 —  silver medal
Svetlana Bakhtina, Elena Dolgopolova, Elena Grosheva, Svetlana Khorkina, Yevgeniya Kuznetsova, Yelena Produnova
 1999 —  silver medal
Svetlana Khorkina, Anna Kovalyova, Yevgeniya Kuznetsova, Yekaterina Lobaznyuk, Yelena Produnova, Elena Zamolodchikova
 2001 —  silver medal
Ludmila Ezhova, Svetlana Khorkina, Elena Zamolodchikova, Maria Zassypkina, Natalia Ziganshina
 2003 — 6th place
Elena Anochina, Aleksandra Shevchenko, Ludmila Ezhova, Svetlana Khorkina, Anna Pavlova, Elena Zamolodchikova
 2006 —  bronze medal
Anna Grudko, Svetlana Klyukina, Polina Miller, Anna Pavlova, Kristina Pravdina, Elena Zamolodchikova
 2007 — 8th place
Svetlana Klyukina, Ekaterina Kramarenko, Yulia Lozhechko, Kristina Pravdina, Ksenia Semyonova, Elena Zamolodchikova
 2010 —  gold medal
Ksenia Afanasyeva, Anna Dementyeva, Ekaterina Kurbatova, Aliya Mustafina, Tatiana Nabieva, Ksenia Semyonova
 2011 —  silver medal
Ksenia Afanasyeva, Yulia Belokobylskaya, Anna Dementyeva, Yulia Inshina, Viktoria Komova, Tatiana Nabieva
 2014 —  bronze medal
Polina Fedorova, Maria Kharenkova, Ekaterina Kramarenko, Aliya Mustafina, Tatiana Nabieva, Alla Sosnitskaya, Daria Spiridonova
 2015 – 4th place
Ksenia Afanasyeva, Maria Kharenkova, Viktoria Komova, Maria Paseka, Daria Spiridonova, Seda Tutkhalyan
 2018 —  silver medal
Lilia Akhaimova, Irina Alexeeva, Angelina Melnikova, Aliya Mustafina, Angelina Simakova, Daria Spiridonova
 2019 —  silver medal
Anastasia Agafonova, Lilia Akhaimova, Angelina Melnikova, Aleksandra Shchekoldina, Daria Spiridonova, Maria Paseka
 2022 – banned from participating

European Games
 2015 —  gold medal
Aliya Mustafina, Viktoria Komova, Seda Tutkhalyan

Junior World Championships
 2019 —  gold medal
Elena Gerasimova, Viktoria Listunova, Vladislava Urazova, Yana Vorona

Most decorated gymnasts
This list includes all Russian female artistic gymnasts who have won at least four medals at the Olympic Games and the World Artistic Gymnastics Championships combined.

Best international results

See also 
Round Lake (gymnastics)
 Russia men's national gymnastics team
 Soviet Union women's national gymnastics team
 List of former Russian women's national gymnastics team rosters
 List of Olympic female artistic gymnasts for Russia

References

Gymnastics in Russia
National women's artistic gymnastics teams
Gymnastics